Urho Castrén's cabinet was the 28th government of Republic of Finland, in office from October 21, 1944, to November 17, 1944. It was a majority government.

Ministers

References

 

Castrén
1944 establishments in Finland
1944 disestablishments in Finland
Cabinets established in 1944
Cabinets disestablished in 1944